Matlock is an American mystery legal drama television series created by Dean Hargrove, starring Andy Griffith in the title role of criminal defense attorney Ben Matlock. The show, produced by Intermedia Entertainment Company (first season only), The Fred Silverman Company, Dean Hargrove Productions (called Strathmore Productions in the first two seasons) and Viacom Productions, originally aired from March 3, 1986, to May 8, 1992, on NBC, and from November 5, 1992, to May 7, 1995, on ABC.

The show's format is similar to that of CBS' Perry Mason (both Matlock and the 1980s Perry Mason television films were created by Dean Hargrove), with Matlock identifying the perpetrators and then confronting them in dramatic courtroom scenes. One difference, however, was that whereas Mason usually exculpated his clients at a pretrial hearing, Matlock usually secured an acquittal at trial from the jury. Since 1991, reruns of Matlock have been shown in syndication and on TBS, INSP, Hallmark Channel, CBS Drama, WGN America, FETV, PlutoTV, and MeTV.

Premise
The show centers on widower Ben Matlock (Andy Griffith), a renowned, folksy and popular though cantankerous attorney. Usually, at the end of the case, the person who is on the stand being questioned by Matlock is the actual perpetrator and Matlock will expose him/her, despite making clear that his one goal is to prove reasonable doubt in the case of his client's guilt or to prove his client's innocence. Matlock studied law at Harvard Law School and, after several years as a public defender, established his law practice in Atlanta, living in a modest farmhouse in a neighboring suburb. He is known to visit crime scenes to discover clues otherwise overlooked and come up with viable alternative theories of the crime in question (usually murder). Matlock also has conspicuously finicky fashion sense; he generally appears in court wearing a trademark light gray suit and, over the series' entire run, owned three generations of the Ford Crown Victoria—always an all-gray model (Griffith's character had always driven Ford products in his 1960s series, The Andy Griffith Show).

Matlock is noted for his thrift and a fondness for hot dogs. In "The Diner" (season eight, episode four), hot dogs are revealed to have been his favorite dish since he was a young man. In contrast, after the series ended, his penchant for hot dogs was explained in the Diagnosis: Murder two-part season four episode "Murder Two" (episodes 15–16). In that episode, Matlock blames Dr. Mark Sloan (Dick Van Dyke) for recommending a disastrous investment in 8-track tapes, in which he lost his savings of $5,000 in 1969, forcing him into wearing cheap suits and living on hot dogs.

Despite his thrift, Matlock's standard fee is $100,000, usually paid up front, but if he or his staff believe strongly enough in the innocence of a client or if the client is unable to pay immediately (if at all), he has them pay over time or reduces the fee significantly or waives it entirely, albeit reluctantly in some cases. He also reluctantly takes a pro bono case occasionally. These traits, and the demands he placed upon his investigators, are often points of comic relief in the series.

Cast

Main
 Andy Griffith as Ben Matlock
 Linda Purl (Lori Lethin in pilot) as Charlene Matlock (season 1), Ben's younger daughter who became a partner to her father before she moved to Philadelphia to set up her own law practice
 Alice Hirson as Hazel (pilot), Matlock's secretary
 Kene Holliday as Tyler Hudson (seasons 1–3; guest season 4), Ben's first private investigator
 Kari Lizer as Cassie Phillips (season 2; recurring season 1), Ben's young file clerk who desired to become partner after Charlene's departure
 Nancy Stafford as Michelle Thomas (seasons 2–6), an American lawyer living in London who becomes an equal partner to Matlock
 Julie Sommars as Julie March (seasons 3–6; recurring seasons 1–2; guest season 9), a district attorney who becomes a good friend to Ben Matlock
 Clarence Gilyard Jr. as Conrad McMasters (seasons 4–7; guest season 8), Ben's second private investigator who is a former deputy sheriff and a rodeo rider
 Brynn Thayer as Leanne MacIntyre (seasons 7–8; guest season 6), Ben's older daughter who works for her father after Michelle's departure
 Daniel Roebuck as Cliff Lewis (seasons 7–9), Ben's last partner and private investigator who graduated from law school and the son of Ben's childhood friend, Billy Lewis
 Carol Huston as Jerri Stone (season 9), Ben's last assistant and private investigator with a talent for singing lullabies

Recurring
 James McEachin as Lieutenant Frank Daniels (season 1), Ben's contact on the Atlanta Police Department
 Michael Durrell as District Attorney Lloyd Burgess (seasons 1–6), chief district attorney for Fulton County, Georgia
 David Froman as Lieutenant Bob Brooks (seasons 1–6), Ben's contact on the Atlanta Police Department
 Don Knotts as Les "Ace" Calhoun (seasons 3–6), Ben's next-door neighbor who was once a client in season three
 Warren Frost as Billy Lewis (seasons 6–9), Ben's childhood friend and Cliff's father

Changes

The series premiered with Ben Matlock played by Andy Griffith having a law practice with his daughter, Charlene (played by Lori Lethin in the pilot movie; Linda Purl took over the role when the series went to air). Matlock also employed stock market whiz Tyler Hudson (Kene Holliday) as a private investigator. Tyler would often go undercover for Matlock in various guises to gather information. Matlock's most frequent legal adversary was Julie March (Julie Sommars), a Nebraska native. Although their jobs as prosecutor and defense attorney made them professional rivals, their relationship outside of court was very cordial and they often spent time together outside of court with occasional flirtations. Toward the end of the first season, Matlock took on cocky law student Cassie Phillips (played by Kari Lizer) as an office worker.

After the first season ended, Purl departed from the series and her character, Charlene, moved to Philadelphia to start her own law practice. To begin the second season, Matlock went to London to try a case where he met Michelle Thomas (played by Nancy Stafford), a young American lawyer. After the case was over, Michelle followed Matlock to the U.S. and became his new law partner. Cassie stayed on as a file clerk until the end of the season, when she disappeared for reasons never made clear. With Lizer's departure, Julie Sommars became a regular cast member.

Several actors appeared in the series as different characters prior to becoming regular cast members. In season one's "The Seduction", Stafford played Caryn Nelson/Carole Nathan, a high-class prostitute who was paid off to commit perjury against Matlock's client. In "The Angel", Lizer appeared as Matlock's client, Margaret Danello, a pop star called "Angel". Roebuck played a young physician, Dr. Bobby Shaw, in "The Doctors"; lawyer Alex Winthrop in season three's two-part episode, "The Ambassador"/"The Priest"; and a prosecutor in a two-part episode, "The Assassination", before becoming a cast regular in season seven.

Some actors appeared as a different character in each appearance on the show. For example, Carolyn Seymour played Christina Harrison Ward in season one ("The Affair", episode 4), Dr. Vanessa Sedgwick in season two ("The Genius", episode 20) and Iris Vogel in season three ("The Psychic", episode 13). Nana Visitor and Roddy McDowall made several guest appearances as well. Holliday was fired after the third season for drug and alcohol abuse, but had a recurring role in season four ("The Best Seller", episode 4 and "The Witness", episode 14). Matlock hired Conrad McMasters (Clarence Gilyard Jr.), a young, former North Carolina deputy sheriff, to be his new detective. Like Tyler, Conrad would also go undercover to gather information about cases. However, the two characters were different in their personalities and approach to the job. Matlock and McMasters became good friends and were alike in many ways.

Don Knotts, who co-starred with Griffith on The Andy Griffith Show, began making frequent appearances as Les "Ace" Calhoun, Matlock's next-door neighbor. Before replacing Stafford at the start of season seven, Brynn Thayer appeared in two season six episodes ("The Suspect", episodes 7–8) as Roxanne Windemere, a rich widow charged with murder with whom Ben became smitten. In the season finale ("The Vacation", episodes 21–22) she appeared as Leanne MacIntyre, Ben's previously unmentioned daughter who takes on the case of a murdered mayor. She joined the cast full-time in season seven. Daniel Roebuck joined Thayer as a new regular for season seven as Cliff Lewis, a naive young lawyer and associate. Warren Frost joined the cast in a recurring role as Billy Lewis, Cliff's father and a personal nemesis from Matlock's past: Ben had abandoned a romance with Billy's sister to pursue his law degree. The move in 1992 to ABC for the remainder of the series caused some cast turnover. Stafford left the series to spend more time with her husband, Larry Myers. Sommars followed, although she would play a recurring role in several later episodes. Knotts followed. With Roebuck joining the cast, Gilyard's role was diminished.

After season seven ended, Gilyard left the series to join the new CBS series Walker, Texas Ranger, although he appeared once in season eight ("The View", episode five). Like Silverman and Hargrove's Perry Mason series revival, Matlock had largely become a series of movies-of-the-week by season nine. Part of the reason for this was Griffith's advancing age; he was 66 and also wanted to spend more time with his family. At the end of season 8, Thayer departed from the series. In the first episode of season nine ("The Accused") Ben tells Billy that Leanne moved to Los Angeles, seems to like her job, and "has a fella." In the final season, Carol Huston joined the series as Jerri Stone, a private investigator helping Cliff in his duties. Like Conrad, Jerri and Ben had shared hobbies including singing. The move also saw a change in filming venue. Shooting in California for its entire run on NBC (which required Griffith to commute from his home in North Carolina to the West Coast), ABC moved production to the EUE/Screen Gems Studios in Wilmington, North Carolina to ease the travel burden on Griffith. The "whodunit" format was also adjusted to an "inverted detective story" format.

Episodes

Matlock aired a total of 193 episodes across nine seasons and began with a TV-movie. 12 two-hour and 15 two-part episodes of the program were aired. Six of the episodes were clip shows with mostly minor plots that paved the way for scenes from previous stories. Although Griffith appeared in more episodes portraying Sheriff Andy Taylor in The Andy Griffith Show than Ben Matlock in Matlock (249–193), he logged more on-screen time as Ben Matlock than he did as Sheriff Andy Taylor due to the length of each show (Matlock ran for 45–48 minutes, while The Andy Griffith Show ran for 25–26 minutes).

Program format
A few changes were made in the format of the introduction of the episodes. The introduction of characters was essentially the same, with the only changes being the actors for each season. Griffith, Purl, Holliday, Stafford, Gilyard Jr., Thayer, Sommars, Lizer, Roebuck and Huston were all featured in the intros for their respective seasons. The Matlock commercial screen also changed. The early episodes had a scene of Ben Matlock in front of a brown screen; around 1987, this was changed to gray. In 1992, this was changed once again to the same gray, but with a blue square around the "M" in "Matlock." Later in the 1993–1994 season, the commercial screen was removed entirely. Nancy Stafford began appearing in a dual role in many opening credits from season three onwards, both as her main character Michelle Thomas, and the high-class call girl she played in the first season (seen on the witness stand, though her face is obscured).

Spinoffs
Jake and the Fatman was a spin-off on CBS based on a character who originated in "The Don" (1986), a two-part Matlock episode from season one. William Conrad played prosecutor James L. McShane and Joe Penny played Paul Baron, the son of Matlock's client, Mafia don Nicholas Baron. Executive producers Fred Silverman and Dean Hargrove were responsible for both Matlock and Jake and the Fatman, as well as Diagnosis: Murder, created by Joyce Burditt (which itself was a spin-off of Jake and the Fatman) in 1993, also on CBS; Father Dowling Mysteries in 1988 on NBC and ABC; and the 30 Perry Mason made-for-TV movies from 1985 until 1995 on NBC.

Home media

DVD releases
CBS Home Entertainment (distributed by Paramount Home Entertainment) has released all nine seasons of Matlock on DVD in Region 1.
On April 7, 2015, CBS released Matlock: The Complete Series on DVD in Region 1.

Streaming
Season one of the series was made available for purchase through Amazon Video.
Series is available On Demand through Pluto TV.

Reboot
On January 31, 2023, it was announced that CBS had ordered a pilot for a reboot of the series starring Kathy Bates. On February 28, 2023, it was reported that Kat Coiro set to direct and executive produce the pilot. On March 2, 2023, it was reported that Skye P. Marshall joined the cast as a lead role. On March 7, 2023, it was reported that David Del Rio and Leah Lewis joined the cast.

See also

References

External links
 
 
 Andy Griffith as Ben Matlock An unofficial Matlock website
 Ben Matlock at TV Acres A page dedicated to Ben Matlock, including notable case synopses and list of Simpsons quotes

 
1980s American drama television series
1980s American legal television series
1986 American television series debuts
1990s American drama television series
1990s American legal television series
1995 American television series endings
American Broadcasting Company original programming
American legal drama television series
American television series revived after cancellation
English-language television shows
NBC original programming
Television series by CBS Studios
Television shows set in Atlanta
Television shows filmed in North Carolina
Television shows filmed in Wilmington, North Carolina